The 1961 French Grand Prix was a Formula One motor race held on 2 July 1961 at Reims. It was race 4 of 8 in both the 1961 World Championship of Drivers and the 1961 International Cup for Formula One Manufacturers.

By winning the race, Giancarlo Baghetti became only the third driver to win his first World Championship race, the other two being Nino Farina, who won the first World Championship race (the 1950 British Grand Prix) and Johnnie Parsons, who won the 1950 Indianapolis 500 (the Indianapolis 500 was part of the World Championship from 1950 to 1960), though both Farina and Parsons had competed at future World Championship races before the creation of the championship, while this was Baghetti's first start at a major Grand Prix. This was Baghetti's only World Championship race win. He would never finish in the top 3 again.

Classification

Qualifying 

† Bianchi was absent for the first day of qualifying. Taylor qualified on Day 1 with Bianchi's car, but French timekeepers only tied the laptimes of a given car to the driver listed alongside in the programme, and his laptime was attributed to Bianchi.

Race

Championship standings after the race

Drivers' Championship standings

Constructors' Championship standings

 Notes: Only the top five positions are included for both sets of standings.

References

French Grand Prix
French Grand Prix
1961 in French motorsport